Belmuri railway station is a Kolkata Suburban Railway station on the Howrah–Bardhaman chord line operated by Eastern Railway zone of Indian Railways. It is situated beside Belmuri Bhandarhati Road, Bahadurpur in Hooghly district in the Indian state of West Bengal. It is wide spread rumour that this railway station is known for bad luck. Naming the station aloud is supposed to be a harbinger of misfortune, so passengers and railway staff use such proxies as Majher Gram. Number of EMU trains stop at Belmuri railway station.

History
The Howrah–Bardhaman chord, the 95 kilometers railway line was constructed in 1917. It was connected with  through Dankuni after construction of Vivekananda Setu in 1932. Howrah to Bardhaman chord line including Belmuri railway station was electrified in 1964–66.

References

Railway stations in Hooghly district
Howrah railway division
Kolkata Suburban Railway stations